The 2013–14 NAGICO Super50 was the 40th season of the Regional Super50, the domestic limited-overs cricket competition for the countries of the West Indies Cricket Board (WICB). The competition was played as a standalone tournament (rather than using a league format), with all matches held in Trinidad and Tobago to coincide with Carnival.

Eight teams contested the competition – the six regular teams of West Indian domestic cricket (Barbados, Guyana, Jamaica, the Leeward Islands, Trinidad and Tobago, and the Windward Islands), plus a development team (Combined Campuses and Colleges) and an invited international team (Ireland). Barbados were undefeated in the group stage and were eventually joined in the final by Trinidad and Tobago. The final was played at Queen's Park Oval, Port of Spain, with Barbados winning by 17 runs to claim its seventh domestic one-day title. Barbadian batsman Dwayne Smith led the tournament in runs, while Trinidad and Tobago's Rayad Emrit led the tournament in wickets.

Squads

 Note: Kirk Edwards was originally named in Barbados' squad for the tournament, but was withdrawn for disciplinary reasons. He was not replaced.

Group stage

Zone A

Zone B

Finals

Semi-finals

Final

Statistics

Most runs
The top five run scorers (total runs) are included in this table.

Source: CricketArchive

Most wickets

The top five wicket takers are listed in this table, listed by wickets taken and then by bowling average.

Source: CricketArchive

See also
 Irish cricket team in the West Indies in 2013–14

References

External links
 Series home at ESPN Crincfo

2014 in West Indian cricket
Domestic cricket competitions in 2013–14
Regional Super50 seasons
2013–14 West Indian cricket season